Francis Sheldon Hackney (December 5, 1933 – September 12, 2013) was a prominent American educator. He was the Boies Professor of United States History at the University of Pennsylvania.

Early life
Hackney was born in Birmingham, Alabama in 1933, and educated in the Birmingham public school system. He was a graduate of Ramsay High School.  After graduating from Vanderbilt University, Hackney earned his Ph.D. in American History at Yale University, where he worked with eminent Southern historian C. Vann Woodward. He subsequently served in the Navy for five years.

Career
Hackney began his career as a lecturer in history at Princeton University. There, he taught in an Upward Bound program for disadvantaged students and played a role in the creation of the university's African American Studies program. While at Princeton, he moved into administration, serving as the provost from 1972 to 1975.

From 1975 to 1980, Hackney was the president of Tulane University. At Tulane, Hackney was best known for approving the November 1979 decision to tear down Tulane Stadium, the on-campus home of the Green Wave football team from 1926 through 1974. The Wave moved to the Louisiana Superdome upon its completion in August 1975. Tulane Stadium stood vacant for nearly five years after Tulane and the NFL's New Orleans Saints played their final games there, hosting high school football games and an ill-fated ZZ Top concert in 1976.

Hackney was president of the University of Pennsylvania from 1981 to 1993. He was elected to the American Philosophical Society in 1988. He was also the Chairman of the National Endowment for the Humanities (NEH) from 1993 to 1997, appointed by President Clinton. His defining initiative in the job was his first: "A National Conversation on American Pluralism and Identity," a project that helped finance and shape about 1,400 public meetings from 1994 to 1997.

Hackney specialized in the history of the American South since the Civil War. He had in an interest in American utopias and other social movements with an emphasis on the Civil Rights Movement and the 1960s. Among the articles and books on history that Hackney published, Populism to Progressivism in Alabama won the Albert J. Beveridge Award of the American Historical Association. Dixie Redux: Essays in Honor of Sheldon Hackney, an edited collection of essays authored by his former students and collaborators will be released in November 2013.

Hackney was credited at the University of Pennsylvania with raising undergraduate minority enrollment from 13 to 30 percent and with increasing the endowment from about $160 million to $1 billion.  Towards the end of his tenure, there was the so-called Water buffalo incident, a controversial affair involving a student charged with racial harassment that raised issues involving free speech and university judicial procedures nationally. In particular, Hackney's role in the incident was a subject of his 1993 Senate confirmation hearings for the NEH appointment. Hackney's memoir about the turmoil of his confirmation, The Politics of Presidential Appointment: A Memoir of the Culture War , was published in 2002.  During his confirmation, critics derided him as the "pope of political correctness."  "I resent bitterly being slandered by slogan", Dr. Hackney told the Senate committee. "I am not just a cardboard figure. I am someone who has spent years defending free speech, and I will do that at NEH as well." He was confirmed, 76 to 23, and assumed the job previously held by Lynne Cheney.

Personal life and death
Hackney was the son-in-law of Virginia and Clifford Durr.

Hackney died at Martha's Vineyard, Massachusetts in 2013, aged 79. He had amyotrophic lateral sclerosis.

Bibliography
 Sheldon Hackney (2005) Magnolias without Moonlight: The American South from Regional Confederacy to National Integration. Transaction Publishers.
 Sheldon Hackney (2002) The Politics of Presidential Appointment: A Memoir of the Culture War. New South Books.
 Sheldon Hackney (1971) Populism: The Critical Issues. Little Brown Books.
 Sheldon Hackney (1969) Populism to Progressivism in Alabama. Princeton University Press.

References

Further reading
 Raymond Arsenault & Vernon Burton (editors) (2013) Dixie Redux: Essays in Honor of Sheldon Hackney. New South Books

External links
Faculty page at the University of Pennsylvania
with Francis Sheldon Hackney  by Stephen McKiernan, Binghamton University Libraries Center for the Study of the 1960s, December 10, 2003
Sheldon Hackney: Gentleman and Scholar, Martha's Vineyard Times, September 6, 2007
 Finding aid to the Sheldon Hackney research notes on African American history, civil rights, and folk songs at the University of Pennsylvania Libraries

1933 births
2013 deaths
Ramsay High School alumni
Vanderbilt University alumni
Yale University alumni
Princeton University faculty
Chief Administrators of the University of Pennsylvania
Presidents of Tulane University
Tulane University faculty
20th-century American historians
Members of the American Philosophical Society
Chairpersons of the National Endowment for the Humanities
21st-century American historians
20th-century American male writers
21st-century American male writers
American male non-fiction writers
Historians from Alabama
Writers from Birmingham, Alabama